Mustafino may refer to:
North Macedonia
 Mustafino, Sveti Nikole

Russia
 Mustafino, Aurgazinsky District, Republic of Bashkortostan
 Mustafino, Bakalinsky District, Republic of Bashkortostan
 Mustafino, Sterlibashevsky District, Republic of Bashkortostan
 Mustafino, Tuymazinsky District, Republic of Bashkortostan